Denis Houf (16 February 1932 – 7 December 2012) was a Belgian international footballer who played as a midfielder.

Career
Born in Fléron, Houf played club football for Standard Liège.

He earned a total of 26 caps for Belgium between 1954 and 1961, and participated at the 1954 FIFA World Cup.

He died on 7 December 2012 in Liège.

References

External links
 

1932 births
2012 deaths
People from Fléron
Belgian footballers
Belgium international footballers
1954 FIFA World Cup players
Association football midfielders
Standard Liège players
Footballers from Liège Province